Kehtna Parish is a rural municipality in central Estonia. It is a part of Rapla County. The municipality has a population of 5,182 (as of 1 January 2004) and covers an area of 507.3 km². The population density is 10.2 inhabitants per km².

Settlements
Boroughs
Järvakandi

Small boroughs
Administrative centre of the municipality is Kehtna small borough. The other small boroughs are Eidapere, Kaerepere, Keava and Lelle.

Villages
Also there are also 43 villages: 
Ahekõnnu - Ellamaa - Haakla - Hertu - Hiie - Ingliste - Käbiküla - Kaerepere - Kalbu - Kärpla - Kehtna-Nurme - Kastna - Kenni - Koogimäe - Koogiste - Kõrbja - Kumma - Laeste - Lalli - Lau - Lellapere - Lellapere-Nurme - Linnaaluste - Lokuta - Metsaääre - Mukri - Nadalama - Nõlva - Ohekatku - Pae - Palasi - Paluküla - Põllu - Põrsaku - Reonda - Rõue - Saarepõllu - Saksa - Saunaküla - Selja - Sooaluste - Valtu-Nurme - Vastja.

Religion

References

External links

 (available only in Estonian)
Kehtna Basic School (available only in Estonian)
Kehtna School of Economy and Technology (available only in Estonian)